Isadore "Izzy" Weinstock (June 27, 1913 – September 26, 1997) was an American football player.  Weinstock attended James M. Coughlin High School in Wilkes-Barre, Pennsylvania, and the University of Pittsburgh. He played college football for the Pitt Panthers football team from 1932 to 1934 and was selected by the Newspaper Enterprise Association and the North American Newspaper Alliance as a first-team fullback on the 1934 College Football All-America Team. He was also chosen as a second-team All-American by the Associated Press. He also played professional football as a fullback in the National Football League for the Philadelphia Eagles in 1935, and for the Pittsburgh Pirates ins 1937 and 1938.  Weinstock sustained a broken nose and thereafter became one of the first football players to wear a face mask.

References

1913 births
1997 deaths
American football fullbacks
Philadelphia Eagles players
Pittsburgh Panthers football players
Pittsburgh Pirates (football) players
Sportspeople from Wilkes-Barre, Pennsylvania
Players of American football from Pennsylvania